The Cyrillization of Polish has been practised in many forms and began in the mid-19th century in the Russian Empire. Between 1772 and 1815, the Russian Empire seized about four fifths of Poland-Lithuania, where Polish was the leading official language. Polish remained the official language of the incorporated Polish-Lithuanian territories until the late 1830s. Later, it was gradually replaced with Russian through the mid-1860s. A middle stage for the transition was the use of the Russian-style Cyrillic for writing Polish.

Russian Cyrillization of Polish 

The system of the Cyrillization of Polish, as employed in today's Russia, emerged during the 1970s in the postwar Soviet Union. It is a form of transcription.

New Polish Cyrillic 

Since the early 1990s Polish-language religious books produced for Catholics in western Belarus (i.e. Hrodno Diocese) have been published in the newly-devised Polish Cyrillic, which is largely based on the Russian form of this alphabet.

Jusowica 
The alphabet that uses Old Church Slavonic "Yus" to convey Polish nasal vowels is called cyrylica polska or simply jusowica. This version of Polish Cyrillic contains 46 letters.

Examples of the use of a hard sign (ъ): съинус, лъикэнд.

Examples of the use of a soft sign (ь):

Sample words

Sample texts

Universal Declaration of Human Rights, Article 1

The Lord's Prayer 
In Polish Cyrillic:

In the Polish Latin alphabet:

References 

Polish
Polish language